This is a list of bridges and viaducts in Canada, including those for pedestrians and vehicular traffic.

Historical and architectural interest bridges 
There are only a few covered bridges left in Canada compared to all those that were built in the past. In the Quebec province, if we already counted 1200 in the last century, today there are only 88 remaining. In New Brunswick, 58 covered bridges have been identified.

Major road and railway bridges 
More than 5,000 local workers helped with the project, which cost about $1 billion.

It helds the record of all-categories longest span in the world until the opening of the Ambassador Bridge, it's the last bridge that broke such a record before suspension bridges hold the award by far. It was designated a National Historic Sites of Canada in 1995.

In 1929, the Ambassador Bridge between Canada and United States surpassed the Quebec Bridge with a  main span and became the largest crossing in the world until the inauguration of the George Washington Bridge in 1931 in New York City which almost doubled the range hitherto achieved.

Studies have been carried out for crossing the Saguenay River near Tadoussac just before the confluence with the St. Lawrence River, the latest project presented by the COWI A/S company includes the construction of a  span suspension bridge with a  clearance above the river.

This table presents the structures with spans greater than 100 meters (non-exhaustive list).

The old bridges over the Niagara 
This part lists all the former bridges which succeeded one another on the Niagara River between the towns of Niagara Falls, Ontario and Queenston in Canada and Niagara Falls, New York and Lewiston in United States. The Whirlpool Rapids Bridge (1897), the Rainbow Bridge (1941) and the Lewiston–Queenston Bridge (1962), still in service are listed in the Major road and railway bridges part above.

Alphabetical list
This part is organized by province and territory.

Alberta

Athabasca River Bridge - Fort McMurray
Beverly Bridge − Edmonton
Briggs Bridge – Briggs
Capilano Bridge − Edmonton
Centre Street Bridge − Calgary
Clover Bar Bridge − Edmonton
Dawson Bridge − Edmonton
Dudley B. Menzies Bridge − Edmonton
Dunvegan Suspension Bridge − Dunvegan
Fabyan Trestle Bridge − Fabyan
Grant MacEwan Bridge − Fort McMurray
George C. King Bridge − Calgary
Groat Bridge − Edmonton
High Level Bridge − Edmonton
James MacDonald Bridge − Edmonton
Reconciliation Bridge − Calgary
Louise Bridge − Calgary
Low Level Bridge − Edmonton
Lethbridge Viaduct − Lethbridge
Mintlaw Viaduct − Mintlaw
Peace Bridge − Calgary
Quesnell Bridge − Edmonton
Ralph Steinhauer Bridge − Fort McMurray
Red Deer Canadian Pacific Railway Bridge − Red Deer
Star Mine Suspension Bridge − Drumheller
Tawatinâ Bridge – Edmonton
Walterdale Bridge − Edmonton

British Columbia

Agassiz-Rosedale Bridge − Agassiz
Alex Fraser Bridge − Richmond/New Westminster - North Delta
Arthur Laing Bridge − Vancouver - YVR, Richmond
Burrard Street Bridge − Vancouver
Cambie Street Bridge − Vancouver
Capilano Suspension Bridge − North Vancouver
Derwent Way Bridge − Delta - New Westminster
Dinsmore Bridge − Richmond
Dollarton Bridge − North Vancouver
Eleanor Ward Bridge − Coquitlam
Fraser Valley Railroad Bridge − New Westminster - Surrey
Georgia Viaduct − Vancouver
Golden Ears Bridge − Langley - Maple Ridge - Pitt Meadows - Surrey
Granville Street Bridge − Vancouver
Hagwilget Canyon Bridge − Hagwilget
Hudson's Hope Suspension Bridge − Hudson's Hope
Ironworkers Memorial Second Narrows Crossing − Vancouver - North Vancouver
Johnson Street Bridge - Victoria
Knight Street Bridge − Vancouver - Richmond
Lions' Gate Bridge − Vancouver - West Vancouver
Lynn Canyon Suspension Bridge − North Vancouver
Lulu Island CN Rail Bridge − Burnaby - Richmond 
Marpole Bridge (road) − Vancouver - Richmond
Marpole CP Rail Bridge − Vancouver - Richmond
McPhee Bridge − Cranbrook
Middle Arm Canada Line Bridge − Richmond
Mission Bridge − Abbotsford
Moray Bridge − Richmond
New Westminster Bridge − New Westminster - Surrey
No. 2 Road Bridge − Richmond
North Arm Canada Line Bridge − Vancouver - Richmond
Oak Street Bridge − Vancouver - Richmond
Overlanders Bridge − Kamloops
Park Bridge − East of Golden, British Columbia
Pattullo Bridge − New Westminster - Surrey
Peace River Bridge
Pitt River Bridge − Port Coquitlam - Pitt Meadows
Port Mann Bridge − Coquitlam - Surrey
Prince George CNR Bridge − Prince George
Queensborough Bridge − New Westminster
Ronyane Bridge − Pemberton
Sea Island Connector − Richmond
Second Narrows Bridge − Vancouver - North Vancouver
Skybridge − New Westminster - Surrey
Westham Island Bridge − Ladner
William R. Bennett Bridge - Kelowna
The Yukon Suspension Bridge - Northern British Columbia

Manitoba

 Arlington Bridge − Winnipeg
 Esplanade Riel − Winnipeg
 The Bridges of St Norbert - St Norbert
 Provencher Bridge − Winnipeg
 Elm Park Bridge − Winnipeg
 St. Vital Bridge − Winnipeg
 Norwood Bridge − Winnipeg
 Main Street Bridge − Winnipeg
 Midtown Bridge (Donald Street Bridge) − Winnipeg
 Osborne Bridge − Winnipeg
 Harry Lazarenko Bridge (Redwood Bridge) − Winnipeg
 Fort Garry Bridge − Winnipeg
 Kildonan Settlers Bridge − Winnipeg
 Maryland Bridge − Winnipeg
 Charleswood Bridge − Winnipeg
 Disraeli Bridge − Winnipeg
 Louise Bridge − Winnipeg
 Slaw Rebchuk Bridge (Salter Street Bridge) − Winnipeg
 North Perimeter Bridge − Winnipeg
 Selkirk Lift Bridge - Selkirk
 South Perimeter Bridge − Winnipeg
 St Peters Dynevor Bridge
 West Perimeter Bridge − Winnipeg
 St. James Bridge − Winnipeg
 Lockport Bridge − Lockport
 Daly Overpass (18th Street Bridge) − Brandon
 8th Street Bridge − Brandon
 1st Street Bridge − Brandon
 Thompson Bridge − Brandon
 Bruce Cameron Bridge − Swan River
 Taylor Bridge − Headingley
 Pierre Delorme Bridge − St. Adolphe
 Baie St Paul Bridge 
 Jack Bend Bridge

Newfoundland and Labrador
Sir Robert Bond Bridge
Queen Elizabeth II Bridge − St. John’s
Sir Ambrose Shea Bridge − Placentia

New Brunswick

Burton Bridge − Burton - Maugerville
Confederation Bridge − Cape Jourimain, NB - Borden, PEI
Centennial Bridge − Miramichi
Edmundston-Madawaska Bridge − Edmundston to Madawaska, Maine
Florenceville Bridge − Florenceville
Fredericton Railway Bridge − Fredericton - South Devon
Gunningsville Bridge − Moncton - Riverview
Hartland Bridge − Hartland
Hawkshaw Bridge − Nackawic
Hugh John Flemming Bridge − Hartland
J. C. Van Horne Bridge − Campbellton - Pointe-à-la-Croix, QC
Jemseg River Bridge − Jemseg
Kelly's Creek Bridge − Upper Kingsclear
Mactaquac Bridge − Mactaquac
Miramichi Bridge − Miramichi
Morrissy Bridge − Miramichi
Nerepis Bridge − Grand Bay-Westfield
Princess Margaret Bridge − Fredericton
Reversing Falls Bridge − Saint John
Reversing Falls Railway Bridge − Saint John
Saint John Harbour Bridge − Saint John
Saint John River High Level Crossing − Coystown
Westmorland Bridge − Fredericton

Northwest Territories
Deh Cho Bridge − Fort Providence

Nova Scotia
Barra Strait Bridge − Barra Strait, Cape Breton Island
Grand Narrows Bridge − Barra Strait, Cape Breton Island
A. Murray MacKay Bridge − Halifax
Angus L. Macdonald Bridge − Halifax
Seal Island Bridge − Boularderie Island - Cape Breton Island
Canso Canal swing bridge − Port Hastings
George Street Bridge − New Glasgow

Ontario

Alexandra Bridge − Ottawa – Gatineau, QC
Ambassador Bridge − Windsor – Detroit, MI
Blackfriars Street Bridge − London
Blue Water Bridge − Point Edward – Port Huron, MI
Burgoyne Bridge – St. Catharines
Champlain Bridge − Ottawa – Gatineau, QC
Chaudière Bridge − Ottawa - Gatineau, QC
Gordie Howe International Bridge − Windsor – Detroit, MI
Garden City Skyway − St. Catharines
Heron Road Bridge − Ottawa
Hogg's Hollow Bridge − Toronto
James N. Allan Skyway Bridge (Burlington Bay Skyway) − Hamilton – Burlington
La Salle Causeway − Kingston
Leaside Bridge − Toronto
Little Current Swing Bridge − Little Current – Turner
Nipigon River Bridge − Nipigon
Ogdensburg–Prescott International Bridge − Prescott – Ogdensburg, NY
Peace Bridge − Fort Erie – Buffalo, NY
Portage Bridge − Ottawa - Gatineau
Prince Edward Viaduct (Bloor Street Viaduct) − Toronto
Macdonald-Cartier Bridge − Ottawa – Gatineau, QC
Queenston-Lewiston Bridge − Queenston - Lewiston, NY
Rainbow Bridge − Niagara Falls – Niagara Falls, NY
Sault Ste. Marie International Bridge − Sault Ste. Marie – Sault Ste. Marie, MI
Sgt. Aubrey Cosens VC Memorial Bridge − Latchford
Sioux Narrows Bridge − Sioux Narrows
Temagami Bridge – Timmins
Thousand Islands Bridge − near Ivy Lea – near Fishers Landing, NY
Whirlpool Rapids Bridge − Niagara Falls – Niagara Falls, NY

Prince Edward Island
Confederation Bridge − Borden - Cape Jourimain, NB
Hillsborough River Bridge − Charlottetown - Stratford

Quebec

Ahuntsic Bridge − Laval - Montreal
Alexandra Bridge − Gatineau - Ottawa, ON
Arthur Sauve Bridge − Laval - Saint-Eustache
Arvida Bridge - Jonquière, Québec
Athanase David Bridge − Laval - Bois-des-Filions
Alonzo Wright Bridge − Gatineau - Chelsea
Bordeaux Railway Bridge − Montreal - Laval
Bordeleau bridge − Saint-Séverin (Mékinac) - Mékinac - Mauricie
Brady Bridge − Gatineau
Champlain Bridge − Gatineau - Ottawa, ON
Champlain Bridge − Montreal - Brossard
Charles de Gaulle Bridge − Montreal - Charlemagne
Chaudière Bridge − Gatineau - Ottawa, ON
Draveurs Bridge − Gatineau
Galipeault Bridge − Montreal - L'Île-Perrot
Gedeon Ouimet Bridge − Laval - Boisbriand
Honore Mercier Bridge − Montreal - Kahnawake
Île aux Tourtes Bridge − Montreal - Vaudreuil-Dorion
Île d'Orléans Bridge − Quebec City - Île d'Orléans
Jacques Cartier Bridge − Montreal - Longueuil
J. C. Van Horne Bridge − Pointe-à-la-Croix - Campbellton, NB
Lachapelle Bridge − Laval - Montreal
Lady Aberdeen Bridge − Gatineau
Laurier Railway Bridge − Montreal - Repentigny -Charlemagne
Laviolette Bridge − Trois-Rivières - Bécancour
Le Gardeur Bridge − Montreal - Repentigny
Lepage Bridge − Laval - Terrebonne
Louis Bisson Bridge − Laval - Montreal
Louis-Hippolyte Lafontaine Bridge-Tunnel − Montreal - Boucherville
Macdonald-Cartier Bridge - Hull - Ottawa, ON
Marius Dufresne Bridge − Laval - Rosemère
Matthieu Bridge − Laval - Terrebonne
Médéric Martin Bridge − Laval - Montreal
 Olivier-Charbonneau Bridge − Laval - Montreal
Papineau-Leblanc Bridge − Laval - Montreal
Percy Covered Bridge (Powerscourt) − Elgin - Hinchinbrooke
Pie IX Bridge − Laval - Montreal
Pierre Laporte Bridge − Quebec City - Lévis
Portage Bridge − Gatineau - Ottawa, ON
Quebec Bridge − Quebec City - Lévis
 Saint-Laurent Railway Bridge − Montreal - Kahnawake
Sophie Masson Bridge − Laval - Terrebonne
Vachon Bridge − Laval - Boisbriand
Victoria Bridge − Montreal - Saint-Lambert

Saskatchewan

North Saskatchewan River
Battlefords Bridge − Battleford - North Battleford
Battlefords Bridge (1908) - Battleford - North Battleford
Canadian Northern Railway Bridge − Prince Albert
Diefenbaker Bridge − Prince Albert
Maymont Bridge − Mayfield No. 406
Borden Bridge − Borden
Petrofka Bridge − Blaine Lake No. 434

South Saskatchewan River
Broadway Bridge − Saskatoon
Chief Mistawasis Bridge - Saskatoon
Circle Drive Bridge − Saskatoon
Gordie Howe Bridge − Saskatoon
CPR Bridge − Saskatoon
Grand Trunk Bridge − Saskatoon
Outlook Bridge − Outlook
Spadina Crescent Bridge − Saskatoon Note - Bridge over run-off trench leading into the South Saskatchewan River
Senator Sid Buckwold Bridge − Saskatoon
Traffic Bridge − Saskatoon
University Bridge − Saskatoon
Muskoday Bridge − Muskoday First Nation
St. Louis Bridge − St. Louis
St. Louis Bridge (1915) − St. Louis
Skytrail − Outlook

Saskatchewan River
Crooked Bridge − Nipawin

Other Lakes and Rivers
Albert Memorial Bridge − Regina
Cochin Bridge − Cochin
Long Creek Bridge − Estevan No. 5
Sherwood Forest Bridge − Grand Coulee

Notes and references 
 Notes

 

 

 

 Others references

See also 

 Transport in Canada
 Roads in Canada
 Numbered highways in Canada
 Rail transport in Canada
 Geography of Canada
 List of rivers of Canada
 List of covered bridges in Quebec
 List of covered bridges in New Brunswick
 List of bridges by city: Calgary, Island of Montreal, Ottawa, Toronto
 List of bridges by river: Fraser River, Nechako River, Niagara River, North Saskatchewan River, Ottawa River, Red Deer River, Richelieu River, Rivière des Mille Îles, Rivière des Prairies, St. Lawrence River and the Great Lakes, South Saskatchewan River, Thompson River

External links

Further reading